Momoka Kobori (born 21 March 1999) is a  New Zealand professional golfer. In 2022, she won the TPS Hunter Valley in Australia, and two LET Access Series titles in Europe.

Early life and amateur career
Kobori was born in Karuizawa, Japan and moved to Canterbury, New Zealand with her family when she was eight. Her younger brother Kazuma is also a golfer. He won the New Zealand PGA Championship on the PGA Tour of Australasia as an amateur.

Kobori was a member of the New Zealand national golf academy, and won the 2014 and 2015 Liz Douglas Trophy for the lowest women's stroke average in Canterbury. In 2015, she was runner-up at the Srixon International Junior Classic in Australia and won four times: the U16 Victorian Junior Masters, the Faldo Series Asia New Zealand Qualifying event, the South Island Stroke Play Championship, and the South Island U19 Championship.

In 2016, she won the Queensland Girls Amateur and defended her title at the South Island Stroke Play Championship. She was runner-up at the Australian Girls' Amateur and the Muriwai Open. She made the cut at the 2016 New Zealand Women's Open, a Ladies European Tour co-sanctioned event.

Kobori graduated from Rangiora High School in New Zealand in 2015. She attended Pepperdine University near Malibu, California and played with the Pepperdine Waves women's golf team 2016–2020. She was West Coast Conference Freshman of the Year in 2017 and an All-American as a senior in 2020. She graduated with a degree in sports medicine.

Professional career
Kobori turned professional in January 2021 and soon finished tied for first at the two-day 36-hole Whitford Park Pro-Am in Auckland at eight-under.

In 2022, Kobori played on the WPGA Tour of Australasia where she was runner-up female at the TPS Victoria and TPS Murray River before placing first at the TPS Hunter Valley in March, losing a playoff to Aaron Pike for the overall title. 

Kobori then finished T14 at the Australian Ladies Classic – Bonville and T12 at the Women's NSW Open, both Ladies European Tour co-sanctioned events, before turning her attention to the LET Access Series where she finished runner-up once and won twice in her first four starts.

Amateur wins
2015 South Island Stroke Play Championship, South Island U19 Championship
2016 South Island Stroke Play Championship, Queensland Girls Amateur, Victorian Junior Masters
2019 Branch Law Firm-Dick McGuire Invitational
2020 Muriwai Open

Source:

Professional wins (4)

WPGA Tour of Australasia wins (1)

LET Access Series wins (2)

Charles Tour wins (1)
2021 Whitford Park Pro-Am (tie)

Team appearances
Amateur
New Zealand Interprovincial (representing Canterbury): 2015 (winners), 2020
The Spirit International Amateur Golf Championship (representing New Zealand): 2019

References

External links

New Zealand female golfers
Pepperdine Waves women's golfers
People from Rangiora
Sportspeople from Nagano Prefecture
1999 births
Living people